Egon Vaupel (born 15 November 1950 in Bad Endbach) is a German politician, member of the SPD, and the  mayor of Marburg 2005 - 2015.

References

External links 
  
 Mayor's page on the official website of the City of Marburg 

1950 births
Living people
People from Marburg-Biedenkopf
Mayors of Marburg
Social Democratic Party of Germany politicians